This is a list of Columbia Lions football players in the NFL Draft.

Key

Selections

References

Columbia

Columbia Lions NFL Draft